General Pánfilo Natera is a municipality in the Mexican state of Zacatecas, located approximately  east of the state capital. It is named after , commander of the Central Division of the Constitutional Army in the Mexican Revolution, and governor of Zacatecas in 1915 and from 1940 to 1944.

Geography
It borders the Zacatecan municipalities of Villa González Ortega to the southeast, Ojocaliente to the southwest, Trancoso to the west, and Guadalupe to the northwest. It also borders the municipality of Villa de Ramos in the state of San Luis Potosí to the northeast.

As of 2009, 47.2% of the land in Pánfilo Natera is used for agriculture. The remainder of the land comprises matorral (35.3%), grassland (7.6%), mesquite shrubland (4.5%), and urban areas (1.3%). The municipality lies in the endorheic basin of El Salado. Apart from a small mountainous area in the north of the municipality, its terrain is generally flat. There are no permanent rivers in the municipality. 

Pánfilo Natera has a temperate semi-arid climate with dry winters.

History
The municipality of General Pánfilo Natera is situated in an area that was originally inhabited by the Guachichil, one of the Chichimeca nations. The first Spanish settlement in the area was established in 1763. After Mexican independence, the area was first part of the state of San Luis Potosí, but was annexed to the municipality of Ojocaliente in Zacatecas in 1857.

On 21 July 1928, the municipality of La Blanca was established, separating it from Ojocaliente. The municipality was renamed in honour of General Pánfilo Natera on 11 November 1964.

Administration
The municipal government of General Pánfilo Natera comprises a president, a councillor (Spanish: síndico), and thirteen trustees (regidores), eight elected by relative majority and five by proportional representation. The current president of the municipality is Freddy González Vázquez.

Demographics
In the 2020 Mexican Census, the municipality of General Pánfilo Natera recorded a population of 23,526 inhabitants living in 6040 households. The 2010 Census recorded a population of 22,346 inhabitants in Pánfilo Natera.

INEGI lists 44 localities in the municipality, of which three are classified as urban:
 the municipal seat, also called General Pánfilo Natera, which recorded a population of 4894 inhabitants in the 2020 Census;

Economy and infrastructure
General Pánfilo Natera is primarily an agricultural municipality. The main crops grown are corn, beans and chiles.

Federal Highway 49 runs through the municipality, connecting it to the cities of Zacatecas in the west and San Luis Potosí in the southeast.

References

Municipalities of Zacatecas
1928 establishments in Mexico
States and territories established in 1928